Fugate is a surname. Notable people with the surname include:

 the "Blue Fugates," a Kentucky family with hereditary methemoglobinemia
Boyd C. Fugate (1884–1967), American politician
Caril Ann Fugate (born 1943), American murderer
Christine Fugate, American documentary filmmaker
Craig Fugate (born 1959), American government official
Joe Fugate, American writer and game designer
Katherine Fugate (born 1965), American film and television writer
Terry Fugate-Wilcox (born 1944), American artist
Thomas B. Fugate (1899–1980), American businessman